Robert James de Bruyn (born 26 February 1991, in Johannesburg) is a South African rugby union player. His regular position is centre.

Career

Youth

He then returned to Johannesburg and played for the  team in 2009 and 2010 and for the  team in 2011 and 2012.

Golden Lions
He started the match and scored a try in a 28–25 victory.

Corporate
Nowadays, Robert spends his time killing it as a Senior Client Solutions Manager at Flexport, Amsterdam. Robert has won an accolade as Gouden Gieter for his exceptional management skills.

References

South African rugby union players
Living people
1991 births
Rugby union players from Johannesburg
Golden Lions players
Rugby union centres
Alumni of Michaelhouse